The San Diego Surf Riders are an American professional Twenty20 franchise cricket team that competes in Minor League Cricket (MiLC). The team is based in San Diego, California. It was formed in 2020 as part of 24 original teams to compete in Minor League Cricket. The team is co-owned by Rajinder Ghai, Gangaram Singh, Sanjit Menezes, Jimmy Anklesaria, and Ram Madabushi.

The team's home ground is Canyonside Park, located in San Diego's Rancho Peñasquitos neighborhood. Marty Kain is helming captaincy duties, with American cricketer Mrunal Patel helming vice-captain duties.

Americans Sri Krishna A and Timil Patel lead the batting and bowling leaderboards for the team with 344 runs and 18 wickets.

Franchise history

Background 
Talks of an American Twenty20 league started in November 2018 just before USA Cricket became the new governing body of cricket in the United States. In May 2021, USA Cricket announced they had accepted a bid by American Cricket Enterprises (ACE) for a US$1 billion investment covering the league and other investments benefitting the U.S. national teams.

In an Annual General Meeting on February 21, 2020, it was announced that USA Cricket was planning to launch Major League Cricket in 2021 and Minor League Cricket that summer, but it was delayed due to the COVID-19 pandemic and due to the lack of high-quality cricket stadiums in the USA. Major League Cricket was pushed to a summer-2023 launch and Minor League Cricket was pushed back to July 31, 2021.

USA Cricket CEO Iain Higgins also pointed out cities such as New York City, Houston and Los Angeles with a large cricket fanbase, and targeted them among others as launch cities for Minor League Cricket.

Exhibition league 
In July 2020, the player registration for the Minor League Cricket exhibition league began. On August 15, 2020, USA Cricket announced the teams participating in the exhibition league matches, also listing the owners for each team. The draft for the exhibition league began on August 22, 2020, with the Surf Riders releasing their squad on August 24. Marty Kain was later named as captain for the Surf Riders for the exhibition league.

2021 season 

After the conclusion of the exhibition league, USA Cricket announced that they were planning to launch the inaugural season of Minor League Cricket in spring 2021. Ahead of the official season, which was announced to kick off on July 31, the Lashings announced Marty Kain to continue his role as captain with Mrunal Patel helming vice-captain duties.

In their first match of the season, the Surf Riders defeated the Master Blasters by 5 wickets in a low-scoring game, but then lost to the Lashings by 4 wickets the same day. The Surf Riders, however, only won three times after their opening match victory, once against the Thunderbolts, once against the Master Blasters, and once against the Irving Mustangs. They lost against the Thunderbolts, the Strikers twice, the Blazers twice, the Lashings, Hurricanes, and the Athletics. The Surf Riders finished on top of the Master Blasters, and finished 6th, thus not qualifying for the finals.

2022 season 
Ahead of the 2022 season, Major League Cricket announced that the draft for that season would take place on May 12.

Current squad 
 Players with international caps are listed in bold.
  denotes a player who is currently unavailable for selection.
  denotes a player who is unavailable for rest of the season

Statistics

Most runs 

Source: CricClubs, Last updated: 23 March 2022

Most wickets 

Source: CricClubs, Last updated: 23 March 2022

See also 
 Major League Cricket
 2021 Minor League Cricket season
 2021 Minor League Cricket season squads
 2021 Minor League Cricket season final
 DC Hawks
 Hollywood Master Blasters
 Houston Hurricanes (cricket)
 New Jersey Stallions (cricket)
 SoCal Lashings
 Silicon Valley Strikers
 Seattle Thunderbolts

References 

Minor League Cricket teams
Cricket teams in San Diego
Cricket clubs established in 2020
2020 establishments in California